George J. Zimmermann (1882–1938) was Mayor of the City of Buffalo, New York, serving 1934–1937. He was born in Buffalo on June 19, 1882.  He joined his father's lumber business, eventually becoming a partner.  He married Gertrude Cochrane in 1923.

During the mayoral campaign, Zimmermann travelled to New York City and Washington, D.C. and secured almost $6,000,000 worth of construction to be financed with federal funds for the Fillmore-Lovejoy sewer project and Kensington High School.  He was elected mayor on November 8, 1933, as the Democratic candidate. On April 18, 1936, formal charges were filed against Zimmermann to Governor Herbert H. Lehman charging 20 alleged counts of official misconduct. Included were Zimmermann's part in the sewage disposal project and the reported "deal" with former Mayor Schwab.  A grand jury indicted him. On May 1, 1936 he was arraigned, and returned to work the following day.

After his term he returned to private life. He was once again indicted on March 14, 1938, by a grand jury related to his alleged activity regarding Buffalo 's $15,000,000 sewer project.  A New York Supreme Court jury returned guilty verdicts on six of the nine counts charged against him.  While awaiting the decision from his appeal, he died on September 14, 1938, and was buried in Mt. Calvary Cemetery in Cheektowaga, New York.

References

1882 births
1938 deaths
Mayors of Buffalo, New York
20th-century American politicians